The 1990 Five Nations Championship was the 61st series of the Five Nations Championship, an annual rugby union competition between the major rugby union national teams in Europe. The tournament consisted of ten matches held between 20 January and 24 March 1990.

The tournament was the 61st in its then format as the Five Nations; including its former incarnation as the Home Nations Championship, the 1990 Five Nations was the 96th championship.

Summary
The championship was contested by England, France, Ireland, Scotland and Wales. Scotland won the tournament, achieving a final 13–7 victory over England to win the Grand Slam, their first since 1984 and third overall in the Five Nations. This was also their thirteenth outright victory, including nine victories in the Home Nations, excluding eight titles shared with other countries. It was the third occasion, after 1978 and 1984, on which two teams each with three victories faced off against each other in the final round of matches, with both capable of completing a Grand Slam with a victory, and the first time that the Triple Crown had also been at stake at the same time, as a result of England and Scotland's earlier victories over the other Home Nations. England and France placed second and third with three and two wins respectively, while Ireland and Wales placed fourth and fifth with one victory and none. This was Wales's first whitewash in Championship history.

This was Scotland's final Grand Slam in the Five Nations and penultimate overall win, as they would later win the final 1999 Five Nations Championship on points difference. It also remains Scotland's most recent Grand Slam win, as they have yet to win a Grand Slam since Italy joined what became the Six Nations Championship in 2000.

Participants
The teams involved were:

Squads

Table

Results

 Wales coach John Ryan resigned after this result, being replaced latter by Ron Waldron

References

Five Nations
Six Nations Championship seasons
Five Nations
Five Nations
Five Nations
Five Nations
Five Nations
  
Five Nations
Five Nations
Five Nations